Acneus is a genus of water penny beetles in the family Psephenidae. There are at least four described species in Acneus.

Species
These four species belong to the genus Acneus:
 Acneus beeri Hatch, 1961
 Acneus burnelli (Fender, 1962)
 Acneus oregonensis Fender, 1951
 Acneus quadrimaculatus Horn, 1880

References

Further reading

 
 

Byrrhoidea
Articles created by Qbugbot